Adenike Ebunoluwa Oyagbola (née Akinola) (born May 5, 1931) is a Nigerian diplomat and politician best known for being the first female cabinet minister in Nigeria upon her appointment in 1979.

Life
Born on May 5, 1931, Oyagbola is a native of Igan Alade, a town in Yewa North local government area of Ogun State, South-Western Nigeria where she was born and completed her early education. She then trained to be a teacher at a training college in Ilaro, thereafter, she taught at schools in Yewa and then Mushin, before becoming headmistress of an elementary school in Mushin. In 1960, she went abroad for further training in accounting.

Oyagbola joined the Federal Civil Service in 1963 after completing her studies in England, United Kingdom. In December 1979, she became Nigeria's first female cabinet minister after she was appointed Minister of National Planning under the Shehu Shagari-led administration, a position she held until October 1983. She later became Nigeria's. Ambassador to the United Mexican States of Panama, Costa Rica and Guatemala. She currently serves as the President of the Nigerian chapter of Attitudinal Healing International.

References

1931 births
Living people
Politicians from Ogun State
Nigerian women diplomats
20th-century Nigerian politicians
20th-century Nigerian women politicians
Women government ministers of Nigeria
Ambassadors of Nigeria to Mexico
Ambassadors of Nigeria to Panama
Ambassadors of Nigeria to Guatemala
Ambassadors of Nigeria to Costa Rica
Nigerian women ambassadors